Pueyrredón may refer to:

ARA Pueyrredón, a Garibaldi-class armoured cruiser of the Argentine Navy
Chilean brigantine Águila (1796), the first ship of the Chilean Navy, renamed Pueyrredón
Club Pueyrredón, a rugby union club in Tigre Partido within Greater Buenos Aires
General Pueyrredón Partido, administrative subdivision on the Atlantic coast of Buenos Aires Province, Argentina
Honorio Pueyrredón (1876–1945), an Argentine lawyer, university professor, diplomatic and politician
Juan Martín de Pueyrredón (1776–1850), an Argentine general and politician of the early 19th century
Juan Martín de Pueyrredón Museum, Buenos Aires, near Acassuso, in the partido of San Isidro, in Buenos Aires, Argentina
Prilidiano Pueyrredón (1823–1870), an Argentine painter, architect, and engineer
Pueyrredón (surname)
Villa Pueyrredón, a neighbourhood of Buenos Aires, capital of Argentina
Pueyrredón (Line B Buenos Aires Metro)
Pueyrredón (Line D Buenos Aires Metro)